Isomma hieroglyphicum is a species of dragonfly in the family Gomphidae. It is endemic to Madagascar.

References

Gomphidae
Insects of Madagascar
Taxa named by Edmond de Sélys Longchamps
Insects described in 1892
Taxonomy articles created by Polbot